Marche à l'ombre may refer to:

 Marche à l'ombre (album), a 1980 album by Renaud
 Marche à l'ombre (film), a 1984 French film